This was the first edition of the tournament.

Yannick Hanfmann and Kevin Krawietz won the title after defeating Luke Bambridge and Jonny O'Mara 6–2, 7–6(7–3) in the final.

Seeds

Draw

References
 Main Draw

CDMX Open - Doubles